The Jaguar XJ-S (later called XJS) is a luxury grand tourer manufactured and marketed by British car manufacturer Jaguar Cars from 1975 to 1996, in coupé, fixed-profile and full convertible bodystyles. There were three distinct iterations, with a final production total of 115,413 units over 20 years and seven months.

Originally developed using the platform of the then-current XJ saloon, the XJ-S was noted for its prominent rear buttresses. The early styling was partially by Jaguar's aerodynamicist Malcolm Sayer—one of the first designers to apply advanced aero principles to cars—however Sayer died in 1970, before the design was finalised.

Its final iteration, produced from 1991 to 1996, was manufactured after Jaguar was acquired by Ford, who introduced numerous modifications – and eliminated the hyphen in the name, marketing Jaguar's longest running model simply as the XJS.

Pre-HE (1975–1981) 

The  XJ-S was introduced on 10 September 1975. The design and development had begun in the late 1960s by the code name of project XJ27, with an initial shape penned by Malcolm Sayer, but after his death in 1970 it was completed by the in-house Jaguar design team, headed by Doug Thorpe. Power came from the Jaguar V12 engine with a choice of a manual or an automatic transmission, but the manual was soon dropped as they were left over from V12 E Type production. V12 powered production automobiles were unusual at the time; Italian luxury sports car makers Lamborghini and Ferrari produced such models. The first series of XJ-S cars had a BorgWarner Model 12 transmission with a cast-iron case and a bolt-on bell-housing. In 1977, General Motors' Turbo-Hydramatic 400 transmissions were fitted. The TH400 transmission was an all-aluminium alloy case with an integrated non-detachable bell-housing. The XJ-S was originally supplied with Dunlop SP Super E205/70VR15 tyres on 6K alloy wheels; British police upgraded their Jaguars to a higher-performance 205/70VR15 Michelin XWX tyres. At the end of the 1970s Jaguar started to fit the 205/70VR15 Pirelli P5. The Pirelli P5 was the tyre that Jaguar had asked Pirelli to produce to improve their luxury cars.

Jaguar launched the XJ-S in the wake of a fuel crisis, when the market for a 5.3-litre V12 grand tourer was small. The buttresses behind the windows were criticised at the time as German authorities feared these would restrict rearward vision, and refused to give the XJ-S, and the similarly designed Lancia Montecarlo, type approval – requiring German XJ-S buyers to obtain road approval for each individual car upon registration.

Italian styling house Pininfarina introduced a 1978 concept car based on the XJ-S, called the Jaguar XJSpider; which did not see production.

HE (1981–1991) 

From July 1981, the XJ-S was renamed the XJ-S HE and received the new High-Efficiency V12 engine for much better fuel economy. At the same time, the XJ-S HE received changes to its exterior and interior (body-coloured boot trim in place of the standard previous black, new five-spoke (starfish) alloy wheels fitted with 215/70R15 Pirelli Cinturato P5, chrome inserts on the upper part of the bumpers, burled elm inserts on dashboard and door cappings).

Six-cylinder and convertible models

In 1983, the new 3.6-litre Jaguar AJ6 straight-six engine was introduced along with a new convertible model called the XJ-SC. The coupé's rather small rear seats were removed in order to make space for the removable soft top, making it a 2-seat car. The XJ-SC was not a full convertible but was a fixed profile variant with a non-removable centre targa-type structure, fixed cant rails above the doors, and fixed rear quarter windows. The six-cylinder cars can be identified by a raised bonnet center section.

Between 1983 and 1987, the six-cylinder-engined cars were only available with a five-speed manual transmission (Getrag 265), with a four-speed automatic (ZF 4HP22) offered from 1987 onwards (along with improved fuel injection as used on the XJ40). The earlier, manual models were not imported by Jaguar into the United States, which had to wait until the facelift manual 4-litre XJS coupé and convertible became available. A V12 powered XJ-SC was introduced in 1985.

The two-seat XJ-SC targa-type model, never a great success in the marketplace, was replaced by a two-seat full convertible in 1988 which proved to be a great hit.

XJ-SC

The first XJ-SC was produced on June 28, 1982, the last January 26, 1988.  In all 5013 XJ-SC Cabriolets were built.  These cars were different in that they had a Targa/Convertible body style with removable Targa panels over the two seater passenger compartment, similar to T-tops, plus a fabric rear section including the rear window; there was an optional hard top for the rear section.  Approximately 1598 Right Hand Drive and 3416 Left Hand Drive cars built.  Some cars were converted by the factory to from RHD to LHD and LHD to RHD for factory experimental use and ultimately to be shipped to the target country and some were dismantled.  Whilst there are a small number of the XJ-SC cars with the rear seat conversion. Jaguar Cars only ever produced one such car which was specially built for Princess Diana. The rear roof section on this car was fully secured in place and could not be removed. This conversion was later carried out by several aftermarket companies on owners cars, not with the approval of the works.  There were several specials built as there were for other XJS cars, the Princess Diana Cabriolet and there is a very rare Guy Salmon Jubilee Celebration car, only 3 believed to be built a Burberry Special Edition also believed to be only 3 produced.

Hess & Eisenhardt convertible
From 1986, a full convertible version was available through some dealers, modified by Hess & Eisenhardt in the USA. The Hess & Eisenhardt coachbuilding firm was located in Ohio, USA, and built convertible modifications for the XJ-S under contract from Jaguar, before the official Jaguar-built XJ-S full convertible became available in 1988.

The Hess & Eisenhardt convertible differed from the later Jaguar-built XJS convertible as its un-padded top folded down deeper into the body structure of the car resulting in a cleaner rear profile when the roof was lowered. To accommodate this design element, the Hess & Eisenhardt convertibles have two separate fuel tanks, positioned to allow for the roof to fully retract. The process of converting the stock Jaguar XJS coupé into the H&E Convertible included the post-production removal of the roof, cutting the body in several sections, the addition of steel reinforcements behind the driver's seat, and  weights placed just behind the headlights to eliminate harmonic resonance caused by the significant modifications to the car. H&E XJS convertibles are easily identified by the lower folding top, as well as two small badges located just behind the front wheels. The later Jaguar full convertible had a heavier padded top that did not fold as low as the H&E convertible, but retained nearly all of the original components of the coupé.

The number of H&E Jaguar XJS produced is unknown, partly because a fire at the Hess & Eisenhardt factory destroyed most of the records pertaining to the Jaguar XJS conversions. According to some sources, a total of 2,100 cars were converted.

XJR-S

From 1988 to 1993, a special high performance XJR-S version equipped with the  HE V12 engine was produced by the newly formed JaguarSport, a separate company owned in a ratio of 50:50 by Jaguar and TWR Group Limited specialising in developing high performance Jaguar sports cars. The car had a distinctive body kit, special 15" alloy wheels, 235/60R15 Pirelli P600 tyres, a unique suspension system utilising modified coil springs and Bilstein shocks, a luxurious interior with Connolly Autolux leather along with walnut wood trim, and handling improvements. The first 100 of these cars were named "Celebration Le Mans" to commemorate Jaguar's 1988 win at the 24 Hours of Le Mans and were only sold in the UK. This was different from the standard 6.0-litre engine used in the late XJS models and was unique to this model. A modified air intake system and a low loss dual exhaust system was also standard on the model. The engine was mated to the 3-speed GM400 automatic transmission utilising a recalibrated valve body and had faster shift times. The car was equipped with 16" Dunlop D40 M2 tyres for better grip. During a comparison test conducted by Motorsport magazine in 1997, the XJR-S outperformed the other competitors which included a BMW 850i, Porsche 928 GT and a Ferrari Mondial.

A total of 787 coupés and 50 convertible cars were built for the world market. In the United States, to commemorate the XJ220 launch in 1992, a limited number of 100 XJR-S coupés and convertibles were produced for the American market only. These included 22 Signal Red coupés, 22 Signal Red convertibles, 22 Jet Black coupés, 27 Jet Black convertibles, 2 Flamenco Red coupés, and the Silver Frost 'Press Cars' of 4 coupés and 1 convertible.

Daimler

Jaguar considered a luxury Daimler version to be marketed as the Daimler-S, notably without the buttresses and with only a single prototype built in 1986. Paul Banham did produce some custom notch back coupés without buttresses, larger rear side windows, and a narrow C-pillars. In the mid-90s, Banham also made a reworked version called the XJSS based on the XJS.

Facelift (1991–1996) 

The XJS was relaunched in its final form in May 1991 under Ford Motor Company's new ownership, as a division of its Premier Auto Group. Ford dropped the model name's hyphen, marketing it as the XJS. The rear side windows appeared enlarged despite having identical glass apertures as the earlier cars, and the buttresses remained, minimised by the new side window trim. Designer Geoff Lawson noted the buttresses were part of the car's character.

The car received a new 4.0-litre version of the AJ6 straight-six engine. In 1992, a convertible model having the same engine was added to the range. Outboard rear brakes replaced the more complicated inboard brakes of previous models. With the introduction of the 6.0-litre V12, the transmission was also updated to a GM 4L80E with a fourth-gear overdrive, whilst the automatic 4.0-litre models continued with the electronic ZF4HP24E transmission. A 2+2 convertible was also introduced, as was a customized insignia line. At the same time, the car received more aerodynamic front and rear bumpers. The main interior change was to the instrument pack; the original featured distinctive drum type ancillary gauges - this was replaced by a more conventional style binnacle similar to that found in the XJ40 saloon.

In April 1994, substantial revisions were made to the 4.0-litre AJ6 engine and it was given a new name of AJ16, now equipped with coil-on-plug ignition. In 1995, the final specification changes were made and the car was referred to as the Celebration model to celebrate the 60th year of Jaguar Cars. Celebration cars feature diamond turned wheels, Jaguar embossed seats and a wooden steering wheel.

The XJS was discontinued in 1996, after 21 years in production, superseded by the XK8.

Aftermarket modifications

Lynx Eventer 

A number of XJS's were modified by coachbuilders Lynx to create a three-door shooting brake, marketed as the Lynx Eventer.
Records suggest that 52 pre-facelift XJ-S, and 15 post-facelift XJS, were adapted, with 18 being left hand drive and 49 being right hand drive.

Lister-Jaguar XJS 

In 1986, the newly-formed Lister Cars, under the leadership of engineer Laurence Pearce, began offering a high performance package for the Jaguar XJS. The cars were sold as Lister-Jaguar and 90 customer cars in total were converted. Lister teamed up with two manufacturers namely WP Automotive and BLE Automotive to carry out the conversion process. The standard package included increased engine displacement to 7.0-litres, a modified fuel injection system with four additional injectors and throttle bodies, larger engine valves along with connecting rods manufactured by Cosworth, a new crankshaft, new cylinder heads, new inlet and exhaust valves, new bearing caps, and a new body kit featuring a spoiler at the rear with a modified rear light clusters and flared wheel arches to accommodate the wide tyres. The modified suspension system featured Koni dampers having 30% stiffer rebound than the original and having a modified rear subframe arrangement with wishbones and radius arms relocated to provide greater triangulation and reduce axle tramp. The new shocks were 100% stiff at the front and 50% stiff at the rear. The braking system had ventilated brake discs and were moved outward for better cooling and stability. The interior was also modified and now had Recaro racing bucket seats and a new steering wheel with optimised feedback. The engine was mated to a 5-speed Getrag manual transmission. The cars were fitted with 17-inch wheels with wide Pirelli tyres measuring 10-inch at the front and 13-inch at the rear.

Some customers further got their cars modified with the addition of the Le Mans package.

XJS Monaco 

Under license from Jaguar build by Paul Bailey Design. The Sultan of Brunei is said to have purchased two of the 11 cars completed.

Motorsport

For 1977, the "Group 44" racing team had a very successful season in Trans Am with a race car based on the actual production XJ-S chassis and running gear. The team won the series' 1977 drivers' championship cup for Bob Tullius but missed winning the manufacturer's title by two points (only one Jaguar was competing in the Trans-Am series compared to many more Porsche entrants). In 1978, a purpose-built tube-frame "silhouette" style XJS race car was constructed which greatly reduced the weight compared to the full production chassis car campaigned in 1977. This silhouette car had only the production car's roof panel as the sole piece of factory XJS sheetmetal on the car. Group 44 succeeded in again capturing the driver's championship for Bob Tullius and also captured the manufacturer's title as well, by entering Brian Fuerstenau driving the 1977 car at some venues to gain additional manufacturer's points for Jaguar. The silhouette car survived and has surfaced recently in the SVRA historic sports race series. The 1977 factory chassis race car is believed to still be in the hands of Group 44's Bob Tullius.

In April 1979 a Jaguar XJS driven by Dave Heinz and Dave Yarborough was entered into Cannonball Baker Sea-To-Shining-Sea Memorial Trophy Dash, widely known simply as the Cannonball Run. Diem and Turner covered the same distance in 32 hours and 7 minutes on the US Express, an unofficial successor to the Cannonball Run.

Tom Walkinshaw Racing
In 1982 Tom Walkinshaw's TWR had entered a team of the V12 XJS' into the European Touring Car Championship, the cars built to the FIA's Group A touring car rules. The XJS won its first race that season when Walkinshaw and Chuck Nicholson won the XIV Grand Prix Brno, the cars simply proving too fast for their rival BMW 530/530i and Alfa Romeo GTV6 opposition with Walkinshaw qualifying 5.37 seconds faster than anyone else on the 10.925 km (6.789 mi) Brno Circuit. After more victories for the team's Jaguars in 1983 (including lapping the 20.81 km (12.93 mi) Nürburgring Nordschleife circuit in 7:56.00), the TWR Jaguars were the cars to beat in the ETCC, with Walkinshaw claiming the 1984 ETCC Drivers' Championship. During the championship season the TWR Jaguar team also won the prestigious Spa 24 Hours race with an XJS driven by Walkinshaw, Hans Heyer and Win Percy, proving not only the speed of the cars but the reliability of the 5.3 litre V12 engine. By 1984 the TWR Jaguars had a new challenger in the ETCC. The turbocharged Volvo 240T run by Eggenberger Motorsport arrived on the scene and had the speed to match the V12, though with turbocharging new to touring car racing it took a number of races for reliability to match the cars' speed.

By 1985 the XJS had been retired from European competition and TWR was committed to running the 3.5L V8 Rover Vitesse in the ETCC. Walkinshaw had been to the 1984 James Hardie 1000 at the Mount Panorama Circuit in Bathurst, Australia, to co-drive a locally developed Australian Group C XJS with Australian driver John Goss. However, the tyres failed to arrive at the circuit in time and Walkinshaw eventually qualified 10th having to use front wheels on the car as no suitable rubber was available. Clutch failure saw the car fail to get off the start line and a helpless Walkinshaw was hit from behind by a Chevrolet Camaro Z28, causing the car's instant retirement and the race's first ever restart after the track was blocked at the start/finish line.

The Scot was determined to come back in 1985 and win the race in the first season of Group A in Australia and in 1985 the three TWR XJS Jaguars were brought out of retirement for the James-Hardie 1000. The cars were clearly the class of the field, finishing Hardies Heroes in 1st (Walkinshaw/Percy in #8), 2nd (Jeff Allam/Ron Dickson in #9) and 6th (Goss/Armin Hahne in #10). This time the cars got off the start line and Walkinshaw and Percy dominated most of the race, only losing the lead to the Goss/Hahne car during pit stops (the Allam/Dickson car went out on lap 3 with engine failure). The drivers of the #10 car, who had to battle a broken seat which was held loosely in place by straps and cable ties for well over 100 laps, sat in second most of the way until a split oil line late in the race cost the Walkinshaw/Percy car 3 laps and any chance of victory. 1974 Bathurst 1000 winner Goss won his second "Great Race" while Hahne, who had won the Group A category in the 1984 race driving a TWR Rover, maintained his 100% record with his only Bathurst 1000 win. After having the oil line replaced, Walkinshaw resumed in 4th place but easily caught and passed the JPS Team BMW 635 CSi of 1985 Australian Touring Car Champion Jim Richards in the last laps to make it a Jaguar 1–3, with Walkinshaw following Goss across the finish line in a formation finish.

The TWR XJS Jaguars were next seen late in 1986 at the Fuji 500 in Japan in what was meant to be its Group A swansong as it ran out of FIA homologation in at the end of the year. Against old foes in the BMW 635 CSi and Volvo 240T, as well as newer Group A cars such as the Australian Holden VK Commodore SS Group A V8 and the turbocharged Nissan Skyline DR30 RS, Walkinshaw qualified the XJS on pole, proving how competitive the car could still be in Touring car racing (the cars had been entered in the 1986 Bathurst 1000 and had undergone testing and development which gave a reported an extra , though the car ultimately did not race due to a lack of funding from Jaguar Rover Australia to help with freight costs). The Fuji race saw the Walkinshaw/Percy car lead the race until retiring on lap 6 with no oil pressure after easily holding off the  Holden Commodore of Peter Brock on the circuits 1.5 km (0.93 mi) main straight, while the Hahne/Denny Hulme/Walkinshaw car only lasted until half distance before retiring with a broken differential.

Despite not being eligible for Group A racing in 1987, TWR ran their two Jaguars in the 1987 (January) Nissan Mobil 500 in Wellington, New Zealand under special invitation from the race promoters. Neither car finished with Walkinshaw/Percy suffering diff failure and the Hahne/Hulme car cutting a tyre resulting in a race ending crash after fighting their way into the lead. The cars then raced at Pukekohe, with Percy/Hahne giving the big cat a second-place finish in its final race behind the Perkins Engineering Holden Commodore VK of Australian drivers Larry Perkins and David Parsons.

TWR built a total of 7 cars.

Non TWR

Australian privateer Garry Willmington ran an XJS in the 1985 and 1986 Australian Touring Car Championships, and also the late season endurance races. While he reportedly had obtained more power from the V12 than TWR, Willmington didn't have TWR's resources to develop either the car or engine reliability and results were not forthcoming, though on occasions where the track had a long enough straight (such as Sandown Raceway in Melbourne or the Adelaide International Raceway), the Willmington Jag was usually the fastest car in a straight line. John Goss also ran his own privately entered XJS in the 1986 James Hardie 1000 after Jaguar-Rover Australia pulled its backing of the proposed TWR return to Bathurst due to a severe downturn in the Australian car market forced him to defend his crown alone, though he did receive some technical assistance from TWR. Electrical problems in the race saw Goss finish 24th with veteran Australian driver Bob Muir.

Today the XJS continues to be extensively campaigned in club level motorsport both in the United Kingdom and overseas. Best known of the race series is probably the Jaguar Enthusiasts' Club XJS championship, currently in association with Toyo Tires. Their championship has now been running for over a decade, offering an affordable entry into club motorsport in the UK, and continuing to attract large grids of this unlikely racing car. Cars compete in various states of modification, from barely modified road cars through to full race-specification cars built in homage to the great TWR specials.

Diecast Models

 The original coupé was modelled by Corgi Toys.
 A 1/40 scale model of the convertible was made in China
 The Lynx Eventer was modelled by PRX/IXO
 A 1/18 scale 1975 XJ-S coupé was modelled by Yatming, as part of their 'Road Signature' series
 Autoart produced 1/18 versions of the coupé, convertible and Group A race car that won the 1984 Spa 24 Hour race.
 Oxford produce a 1/76 coupé in a number of colours, including a Return of the Saint and Police car version.

References
Notes

Bibliography

External links

Buyer’s Guide Jaguar XJS
Photos and a short article about the Daimler XJS prototype

Jaguar Clubs of North America
Jaguar Performance – UK
Jaguar Upgrades & Renewals – UK
v12s – USA 
Jaguar Performance & Cooling – USA
Jaguar International Racing

1980s cars
1990s cars
British Leyland vehicles
Grand tourers
XJS
Pininfarina
Rear-wheel-drive vehicles
Cars introduced in 1975
Cars discontinued in 1996
Touring cars
Coupés